The Mount Zion Award is a biennial award by the Mount Zion Foundation, which has its seat at the Institute for Jewish-Christian Research (IJCF) at the University of Lucerne in Switzerland. The award is presented every other year close to October 28th. In 1986 the Mount Zion Foundation was created by the German Reverend Wilhelm Salberg (1925–1996), son of a Jewish father and a Christian mother. The Mount Zion Award is presented to persons of Jewish, Muslim or Christian faith, who have significantly contributed to the Jewish-Christian dialogue or to the understanding of the three Abrahamic religions, Judaism, Christianity and Islam, in Israel.

The presidents of the foundation, Prof. Dr. Verena Lenzen, director of the Institute for Jewish-Christian Research at the University of Lucerne, and the abbot of the Dormition Abbey in Jerusalem, Bernhard Maria Alter OSB, present the Mount Zion Award always at the end of October or at the beginning of November, in remembrance of the Declaration on the Relation of the Catholic Church with Non-Christian Religions Nostra aetate of October 28, 1965.

Laureates 
1987: Dr. Mahmoud Abassi, Al-Masreq Publishing House, Shefar´am / Israel; Rose-Therese Sant, Sister of Zion, Jerusalem
1989: David Grossman, author, Mevasseret Zion / Israel
1991: Elisheva Hemker, Pastoral Officer, Haifa + Nahariya / Israel
1993: Dr. Kirsten Stoffregen-Pedersen ("Sister Abraham"), Jerusalem
1995: Elias und Heyam Jabbour, social worker, Shefar`Am / Israel; Yeheskel and Dalia Landau, social worker, Ramle + Jerusalem
1997: Sumaya Farhat Naser, lecturer at the University of Bir Zeit; Yitzhak Frankenthal, director of Neviot Shalom, Jerusalem
1999: Shmuel Toledano, politician, Jerusalem; Ass`ad Araidy, Druze, mayor of Maghar in Galilee
2001: Kifaya Jadah; ; Emil Shoufany
2003: "Breaking Barriers", Jerusalem/Tel Aviv
2005: Rabbi Dr. David Rosen
2007: Sr. Monika Düllmann, Hôpital Saint-Louis de Jérusalem
2009: Dr. Nedal Jayousi, Palestinian House for Professional Solutions, Ramallah; Daniel Rossing, Jerusalem Center for Jewish-Christian Relations
2011: Friends of the Earth Middle East; Gidon Bromberg (Israeli Director), Munqeth Mehyar (Jordanian Director), Nader Al-Khateeb (Palestinian Director)
2013: Mrs. Yisca Harani, lecturer, researcher and inter-religious activist. And, Mrs. Margratte Karam.
2015: Fr. Dr. David Neuhaus, Patriarchal Vicar for Hebrew speaking Catholics, Coordinator of the Pastoral care of migrants.
2017: Amos Oz, writer, intellectual, professor of literature at Ben-Gurion University in Beersheba
2019: Gadi Gvaryahu from Tag Meir organization and Michael Krupp.
2022: Israel Yuval and Yehuda Bacon.

See also

 List of religion-related awards

References

External links 
 Mount Zion Award

Christian and Jewish interfaith dialogue
Religion-related awards